

Provincial Development Service (PDS) is the Government of Uttar Pradesh civil service responsible for administering rural development programmes of the Uttar Pradesh and Indian governments.

Recruitment
PDS officers are recruited from a pool of applicants who take a competitive examination conducted by the Uttar Pradesh Public Service Commission. Currently, half of PDS officers are hired directly, while the other half are transferred from other departments. PDS officers, regardless of their mode of entry, are appointed by the governor of Uttar Pradesh. Hundreds of BDO officer posts remain vacant, putting a greater workload on PDS officers and officers from other departments.

Career progression 
After completing their training, a PDS officer generally serves as block development officer in blocks in a district. After that, they get promoted as district development officer or as project director of District Rural Development Agency or deputy commissioners of Mahatma Gandhi National Rural Employment Guarantee (popularly known as DC MGNREGA) or deputy commissioners of National Rural Livelihood Mission (popularly known as DC NRLM) and later, chief development officer in districts or as joint development commissioners in divisions and as joint commissioners in Commissionerate of Rural Development.

Salary structure

Officer promotion controversy
The union for PDS officers demanded that IAS and PCS officers not be promoted to the rank of CDO, claiming that they have less expertise in rural development than PDS officers. They also claim that it takes much longer for PDS officers to be promoted than PCS or IAS officers, and that PDS officers get paid less than PCS officers. Due to the complaints, the Uttar Pradesh state government reserved twenty-eight districts of Uttar Pradesh for PDS officers. The PDS union opposed this, claiming that the districts that had been reserved for PDS officers were backward ones.

See also 
 Provincial Civil Service (Uttar Pradesh)
 Provincial Forest Service (Uttar Pradesh)
 Provincial Police Service (Uttar Pradesh)
 Provincial Finance and Accounts Service (Uttar Pradesh)
 Provincial Secretariat Service (Uttar Pradesh)
 Provincial Transport Service (Uttar Pradesh)

References 

Civil Services of Uttar Pradesh
1952 establishments in Uttar Pradesh